CFSE may refer to:

 Carboxyfluorescein succinimidyl ester, a fluorescent cell staining dye
 Crystal field stabilization energy
 Certified Functional Safety Expert